{{DISPLAYTITLE:Upsilon1 Hydrae}}

 
 

Upsilon1 Hydrae (υ1 Hydrae, abbreviated Ups1 Hya, υ1 Hya), also named Zhang, is a yellow-hued star in the constellation of Hydra. It is visible to the naked eye, having an apparent visual magnitude of 4.12. Based upon an annual parallax shift of 12.36 mas as seen from Earth, it is located about 264 light-years from the Sun. The star is moving closer to the Sun with a radial velocity of −14.34 km/s. In 2005 it was announced that it had a substellar companion.

Nomenclature 

υ1 Hydrae (Latinised to Upsilon1 Hydrae) is the star's Bayer designation.

In 2016, the International Astronomical Union (IAU) organized a Working Group on Star Names (WGSN) to catalog and standardize proper names for stars. The WGSN approved the name Zhang for this star on 30 June 2017 and it is now so included in the List of IAU-approved Star Names.

Properties 

With a stellar classification of G6/8 III, Upsilon1 Hydrae is an evolved G-type giant star. It has an estimated 3.3 times the mass of the Sun and has expanded to 14.7 times the Sun's radius. The star is about 270 million years old with a projected rotational velocity of just 2.11 km/s.

Substellar companion 

The Okayama Planet Search team published a paper in 2005 reporting investigations on radial velocity variations observed for a set of class G giants and announcing the detection of a brown dwarf companion in orbit around Upsilon1 Hydrae. The orbital period for this companion is roughly 4.1 years, and it has a high eccentricity of 0.57. Since the inclination of the orbit to the line-of-sight is unknown, only a lower bound on the mass can be determined. It has at least 49 times the mass of Jupiter.

References

G-type giants
Planetary systems with one confirmed planet
Hydra (constellation)
Hydrae, Upsilon1
BD-14 2963
Hydrae, 39
48356
085444
3903